Frank O'Connor (6 November 1923 – 13 November 2017) was an Australian rules footballer who played with Melbourne in the Victorian Football League (VFL).

O'Connor previously served in the Australian Army during World War II.

Notes

External links 

1923 births
2017 deaths
Australian rules footballers from Melbourne
Melbourne Football Club players
Prahran Football Club players
People from Newport, Victoria
Australian Army personnel of World War II
Military personnel from Melbourne